Renco is a village in Masvingo Province, Zimbabwe and is located  from Masvingo. The village grew up around the Renco gold mine. According to the 1982 Population Census, the village had a population of 3,817.

Populated places in Masvingo Province